Tim van Rijthoven defeated Daniil Medvedev in the final, 6–4, 6–1 to win the men's singles tennis title at the 2022 Rosmalen Grass Court Championships. It was his maiden ATP Tour title, and he became the first Dutchman to win an ATP Tour singles title since Robin Haase in 2012. Van Rijthoven entered the tournament as a wildcard, and he won the title by earning his first five ATP Tour wins at the tournament.

Adrian Mannarino was the defending champion from when the event was last held in 2019, but he lost in the semifinals to Medvedev.

Seeds
The top four seeds receive a bye into the second round.

Draw

Finals

Top half

Bottom half

Qualifying

Seeds

Qualifiers

Draw

First qualifier

Second qualifier

Third qualifier

Fourth qualifier

References

External links
Main draw
Qualifying draw

Libéma Open - Men's singles
2022 Men's singles